Augusta School District may refer to:

 Augusta School District (Arkansas), located in Augusta, Arkansas
 Augusta School District (Maine), located in Augusta, Maine
 Augusta School District (Wisconsin), located in Augusta, Wisconsin

Also, refer to:

 Augusta Christian Schools, located in Martinez, Georgia
 Augusta County Public Schools, located in Augusta County, Virginia